Madeleine Lindberg (born 1 March 1972) is a road cyclist from Sweden. She represented her nation at the 1992 Summer Olympics and 2004 Summer Olympics. She also rode between 1993 and 2005 at the UCI Road World Championships. At the 2000 UCI Road World Championships she won the bronze medal in the women's road race. She won several times the Swedish National Road Race Championships and Swedish National Time Trial Championships.

References

External links
 profile at Procyclingstats.com

1972 births
Swedish female cyclists
Living people
Place of birth missing (living people)
Cyclists at the 1992 Summer Olympics
Cyclists at the 2004 Summer Olympics
Olympic cyclists of Sweden
20th-century Swedish women
21st-century Swedish women